Emplacement may refer to:

 A place where something is located
 Fortification
 Artillery battery
 Casemate, fortified gun emplacement
 Redoubt, enclosed defense emplacement
 The geological process of pluton emplacement

See also
 
 
 Placement (disambiguation)